The Cone of Silence is one of many recurring joke devices from Get Smart, a 1960s American comedy television series about an inept spy.  The essence of the joke is that the apparatus, designed for secret conversations, makes it impossible for those inside the device – and easy for those outside the device – to hear the conversation.

History

Precursors
Although popularized by Get Smart, the term  "Cone of Silence" actually originated on the syndicated TV show Science Fiction Theatre, in an episode titled "Barrier of Silence" written by Lou Huston and first airing September 3, 1955. The story focuses on finding a cure for Professor Richard Sheldon, who had been returned to the United States in a confused, altered state of mind after abduction by enemy agents while visiting Milan. Scientists discover that placing Sheldon in an environment of total silence had been the means of brainwashing, a precursor to later ideas of sensory deprivation, celebrated in such films as Altered States and sundry spy thrillers. Sheldon is placed on a chair in the "Cone of Silence", which consists of a raised circular platform suspended by three wires tied to a common vertex. Although the cone's surface is open, noise canceling sound generators located just below the vertex shroud anyone sitting inside in a complete silence impossible in natural surroundings. It is also demonstrated that anyone speaking inside the cone could not be heard outside, which was the feature later parodied in Get Smart. Only a speculative, "science fiction" possibility at that time, such technology is now commonplace in active noise canceling electronics for personal and industrial use.

The concept is also explored in Arthur C. Clarke's 1950 short story "Silence Please", which features a device capable of cancelling sound waves.

In Frank Herbert's science fiction novel Dune—first serialized in Analog from 1963 to 1965 and then published independently in August 1965—the Baron Harkonnen employs a "cone of silence" when having a private discussion with Count Fenring. In the novel's glossary, Herbert describes the device as the sound-deadening "field of a distorter that limits the carrying power of the voice or any other vibrator by damping the vibrations with an image-vibration 180 degrees out of phase". Used for privacy, the field does not visually obscure lip movement. Herbert had previously mentioned the cone of silence, on a much smaller scale, in his 1955 short story "Cease Fire".

Get Smart

The larger, plastic version of the "Cone of Silence", appeared in the pilot episode of Get Smart, entitled "Mr. Big", which aired on September 18, 1965. Mel Brooks and Buck Henry, the original screenwriters for the series, devised many of the running jokes. Henry either borrowed or independently came up with the Cone of Silence concept, which debuted in the pilot along with other show standards, like Fang, the improperly trained dog-agent, and Max's shoe phone. The Cone of Silence scene was shot ahead of the rest of the pilot episode, and was used to sell the series to NBC.

Cones of Silence appear in The Nude Bomb (1980), the first attempt at a theatrical Get Smart movie. Max, the Chief, and the delegates all have their own cone placed over them. Neither the characters nor the audience hear what is being said. In the later sequel movie, Get Smart, Again! (1989), when Maxwell is reactivated as a secret agent, he insists on following protocol to ensure secrecy by using the Cone of Silence. However, the device is considered to be completely outdated (however Max and 99 still have one at home), and the current methods used were the following:

 Hover Cover: The participants converse on the roof of a building while helicopters hover nearby, drowning out all sounds with their rotor blades, thereby preventing anyone from eavesdropping. However, this also prevents those involved from hearing their own words and the intense winds caused by the helicopter's blades throws the participants about.
 Hall of Hush: A chamber with sound-suppressing walls that allow a person's words to appear in front of him like subtitles in a movie. The problem with this device is that the words do not disappear and will eventually fill up the chamber, smothering the speakers in their own dialogues.

A new version of the Cone of Silence appears in the 2008 Get Smart film.  One of the early versions of the Cone used in the television series is on display in the CONTROL museum seen in the beginning of the film. The new version has an appearance more consistent with the cones of silence used in The Nude Bomb than in the television series. It was apparently constructed by the lab guys Bruce and Lloyd, and was untested at the time it was used. It seems much more high-tech, being a small handheld device which, when the button is pressed, creates a cone-shaped beam of light shining down from the ceiling, forming a force field around the person highlighted. This field ought to block all exterior sound, making external communication all but impossible. However, as usual, this updated version is ineffective, creating individual force fields around each person at the table instead of one big field. The force field was shown to be solid, though, to the point where a panicking Larrabee found he could not escape, to the cause of his greater panic. When Max himself attempts to use the device to hide his glee at being named field agent, it malfunctions and does not even raise the field, permitting everybody to hear his embarrassing shouts. However, in fairness to the manufacturers, this was because Max didn't push the button hard enough.

Variations and related devices

Throughout the five seasons of Get Smart, the Cone of Silence appears many times. For security reasons, Maxwell Smart insists upon using it to discuss his case. Despite this, its use is always counterproductive in some way:
 During the first episode of the show, the Cone of Silence is lowered. Once it's in place, Max and the Chief can barely hear each other. The frustrated Chief then asks Hodgkins (a CONTROL scientist) to raise it, but Hodgkins can't hear him either.
 The Cone of Silence produces a very strong echo that gives both characters a headache.
 In perhaps one of the most comical moments involving the Cone of Silence, the Chief and Max can't hear each other.  Hodgkins, outside the Cone, can hear them perfectly and acts as a relay between the two.
 After the Cone of Silence is lowered, it randomly raises and lowers.  As Max and the Chief stand and sit to accommodate it, the Cone finally goes so low that it breaks through the Chief's desk, forcing them both to sit on the floor.
 In an episode where Max is asked to investigate KAOS headquarters, the Chief asks him what he found out, he once again insists upon the Cone of Silence, and the Chief reluctantly agrees. When it is lowered Max says he found out nothing, leaving the Chief highly frustrated. This is one of the few occasions where the Cone of Silence itself did not malfunction. Instead, its use was completely unnecessary.
 Another episode involves Max and the Chief using cards with words written on them to communicate. Max made a mistake at one point: The card that reads 99 was upside-down. The Chief responds with "Who is 66?"
 Max insists on lowering the cone of silence to discuss something top secret. Once lowered, he asks the Chief to borrow twenty dollars, frustrating the Chief. When the Chief says that he can't believe that, Max says "Would you believe, thirty dollars". After the Chief insists on raising it, Max reveals that the controls are on the outside, and when slipping out of it, 99 rings the doorbell, and Max forgets about the Chief, who is yelling and gesticulating – inaudibly, within the Cone.

The series also employs related technology:
 Closet of Silence: In one episode, when the Cone of Silence is not working, Max insists on using the "Closet of Silence". In the Closet, there are so many coats and jackets, they can barely hear each other, and cannot get out of the Closet, so Max shoots the lock off, injuring Larabee in the process.
 Portable Cone of Silence: In one episode, when Max and Chief are not in the office, Max brings along a portable Cone of Silence for them to use. This Cone seems to work, as the two can hear each other perfectly. Of course, the audience can hear them too. This cone apparently obscured the Chief's vision, and echoed violently when struck. When they try to take them off, Max succeeds but has to help the chief get his off. He uses his shoe and the butt of his gun, but the Chief finally breaks out after falling off a stage.
 Umbrella of Silence: In one episode, Max, 99 and Chief go to England where they meet the Chief of English CONTROL, who has an Umbrella of Silence which can fit more people in, but the disadvantage is that since the Chief of English CONTROL smokes a lot, he intolerably pollutes the air inside.

See also
 Sensitive Compartmented Information Facility, used by US Federal Government to deliver similar functions today
 The Zone of Silence, a purported area of radio silence in Mexico
 United States National Radio Quiet Zone, " a large area of land in the United States designated as a radio quiet zone, in which radio transmissions are heavily restricted by law to facilitate scientific research and military intelligence."

References

External links
Get Smart
WouldYouBelieve.com: The Get Smart Web Page
History of the AN range and its "cone of silence"
Get Smart image (theage.com.au)

Fictional technology
Privacy
Secrecy
Get Smart